The Disaster Mitigation Act of 2000, Public Law 106-390, also called DMA2K, is U.S. federal legislation passed in 2000 that amended provisions of the United States Code related to disaster relief.  The amended provisions are named after Robert Stafford, who led the passage of the Stafford Disaster Relief and Emergency Assistance Act of 1988.

The 2000 act amends Chapter 68 of Title 42 of the United States Code. Its provisions are titled DISASTER RELIEF - THE PUBLIC HEALTH AND WELFARE.

The chapter sets forth declarations and definitions relating to disaster relief and is used as a central document for the activities of the Federal Emergency Management Agency.

Congressional findings and declarations
§ 5121. CONGRESSIONAL FINDINGS AND DECLARATIONS {Sec. 101}
  
a) The Congress hereby finds and declares that-- 
because disasters often cause loss of life, human suffering, loss of income, and property loss and damage; and
because disasters often disrupt the normal functioning of governments and communities, and adversely affect individuals and families with great severity;
 
special measures, designed to assist the efforts of the affected States in expediting the rendering of aid, assistance, and emergency services, and the reconstruction and rehabilitation of devastated areas, are necessary.

b) It is the intent of the Congress, by this Act, to provide an orderly and continuing means of assistance 
by the Federal Government to State and local governments in carrying out their responsibilities 
to alleviate the suffering and damage which result from such disasters by-- 
revising and broadening the scope of existing disaster relief programs;
encouraging the development of comprehensive disaster preparedness and assistance plans, programs, capabilities, and organizations by the States and by local governments;
achieving greater coordination and responsiveness of disaster preparedness and relief programs;
encouraging individuals, States, and local governments to protect themselves by obtaining insurance coverage to supplement or replace governmental assistance;
encouraging hazard mitigation measures to reduce losses from disasters, including development of land use and construction regulations; and
providing Federal assistance programs for both public and private losses sustained in disasters [.]
 
(Pub. L. 93-288, title I, § 101, May 22, 1974, 88 Stat. 143; Pub. L. 100-707, title I, § 103(a), Nov. 23, 1988, 102 Stat. 4689.)

External links
 FEMA Library - Disaster Mitigation Act of 2000
 Search the U.S. Code House of Representatives Site
 U.S. Code Official Government site
 Office of Law Revision Counsel
 U.S. Code online at findlaw.com
 U.S. Code online at Cornell
 Acts listed by popular name (at Cornell's US Code site)

Acts of the 106th United States Congress
United States federal emergency management legislation
United States federal legislation articles without infoboxes